Plandome is a station on the Long Island Rail Road's Port Washington Branch in Plandome, New York. It is located off Stonytown Road and Rockwood Road, near West Circle Drive and Colonial Drive.

History
Plandome station was built in 1909, and as such was the last station to be built on the Port Washington Branch until the World's Fair station opened in Queens in 1939. The track was first laid in 1898 with the building of the Manhasset Viaduct, which allowed for the extension of the railroad line from Great Neck to Port Washington; the stone bridge carrying the track over Stonytown Road was built as part of this extension. Plandome was a flag stop on the extended line until the station was built in 1909. 

The original station house burned in a fire set by vandals in January 1987. The Plandome Fire Department had historically used the station for drill exercises, so had an advantage if and when an actual fire occurred there. By 1990, it was rebuilt to more modern standards with turn-of-the-century characteristics. 

The station also serves as the location of the Plandome Branch of the United States Postal Service. The post office was originally located on the second floor of the station, adjacent to the small waiting room, along the tracks until the fire. After the station was rebuilt, it was rebuilt, as well, and was relocated to street-level.

In the early 2000s, a bus owned by the Long Island Rail Road powered by natural gas skimmed the top of the low bridge near the station, knocking off the top of its roof. The gas, carried in the roof, did not explode, and damage was minimal.

Station layout
This station has one 10-car-long side platform east of the track.

References

External links

Unofficial LIRR History Website
Station photo from December 2006
View from platform
1962 Image of Plandome Station (NYCSubway.org)
 Stonytown Road entrance from Google Maps Street View
Platform from Google Maps Street View
Waiting Room from Google Maps Street View

Railway stations in the United States opened in 1909
Long Island Rail Road stations in Nassau County, New York
Plandome, New York
1909 establishments in New York (state)